Jonas Prising is a business executive in the personnel industry.

Current executive roles
Prising became Chief Executive Officer of ManpowerGroup Inc. in 2014, giving him responsibility for ManpowerGroup's $20 billion global operations.  He is the fourth CEO the company has had in its 68-year history.

He has been with the ManpowerGroup since 1999.

Boards
Prising serves on the JA Worldwide, JA USA and JA of Wisconsin Inc., boards.  He is co-chair of MiKE.

Employment history
Prior to his current leadership role at ManpowerGroup Inc., Prising held other key executive roles at the firm.  This includes: President of The Americas Operations at Manpower Inc. and three years earlier its Executive Vice President.
Prising held other roles at other firms in the past including: Executive VP at Experis US, Inc., President of United States and Canadian Operations of Manpower Inc., the Executive VP of US and Canadian Operations, Managing Director of Manpower Italy of Manpower Inc., Director of Manpower Global Accounts of EMEA, President of North America and President of the Americas at Manpower Inc., and also a range of key roles at Electrolux.

Education
Prising has the equivalent of an MBA from the Stockholm School of Economics.

Additional information
Prising speaks five languages: English, French, German, Italian and Swedish. He has lived in nine countries spanning the Asia, Europe and North American regions.  He lives with his family in the Milwaukee area. He takes part in an amateur ice hockey league. He has both American and Swedish citizenship.  He was described by outgoing President and CEO Jeffrey Joerres as being “absolutely ready” to take on the role of heading the company and that he is a “true global citizen.”  He believes that Prising’s knowledge of France is extremely useful for the firm as it is their single biggest market.

One of his claims to fame is that out of all active Fortune 500 CEOs, Prising has been on Twitter the longest, at 2,145 days.

Event participation
Over the years Prising has participated in various executive events.  This includes such programs at INSEAD, Stanford and Yale, as well as the World Economic Forum annual and regional meetings.  He also often speaks at various conferences and summits internationally. He offers insights into work trends for the media.

References

Living people
American chief executives
Year of birth missing (living people)